The Herb River is an  tidal river in the U.S. state of Georgia. It is located in Chatham County, near the southeastern edge of Savannah. It connects with the Wilmington River to the north and the Moon River to the south, and it separates the mainland on the west from Isle of Hope and Dutch Island to the east.

See also
List of rivers of Georgia

References 

USGS Hydrologic Unit Map - State of Georgia (1974)

Rivers of Georgia (U.S. state)
Rivers of Chatham County, Georgia